Malos may refer to:
Milos, an island of Greece
Malos (Galatia), a town of ancient Galatia, now in Turkey
Malos (Phrygia), a town of ancient Phrygia, now in Turkey
Malos (Pisidia), a town of ancient Pisidia, now in Turkey